LG9 or variation, may refer to:

 Diamond Creek (LG9), Grand Canyon Backcountry Camping
 Tingliao MRT Station (station code LG09) on the Wanda–Zhonghe–Shulin line, Taipei, Taiwan
 Gulbene District (LG09), Latvia; see List of FIPS region codes (J–L)

See also

 LG (disambiguation)